This is a list of Big South Conference football champions. Formed in 1983, the Big South did not sponsor football until 2002. It was not until 2010 that the Big South got an automatic bid to send its champion to the NCAA Division I Football Championship.

Champions by year

Italics indicate a team that won the tiebreaker to get the Big South's automatic bid to the NCAA Division I Football Championship tournament.

Championships by team

References

 Big South Conference Champions at College Football Data Warehouse

Big South Conference
Big South Conference football